Route 60 may refer to:

Route 60 (MTA Maryland), a bus route in Baltimore, Maryland and its suburbs
London Buses route 60
Route 60 (WMATA), a bus route in Washington, D.C.

See also
List of highways numbered 60

60